Simon Alexander Angell is a New Zealand former professional rugby league footballer who played in the 1980s and 1990s.

Playing career
From the Hornby club, Angell played for the Canterbury side that bet Auckland in 1993, starting in the second row in the Provincial grand final.

He played for the Christchurch City Shiners in the 1994 Lion Red Cup.

Angell was then signed to the Auckland Warriors in 1995 but did not play in the first grade team. He signed with the Featherstone Rovers for the 1995/96 season but in February 1996 Featherstone had to cut his contract as a cost-cutting measure. Angell played the rest of the 1996 season with the Salford City Reds and remained there for 1997.

He then returned to Canterbury and resumed his provincial representative career. In 1998 he played for the Tasman Orcas as an import player while playing for the Hornby Panthers in the Canterbury Rugby League.

Between 1999 and 2003 Angell played for the Canning Bulldogs in the Western Australia Rugby League competition.

Representative career
Angell was named in the touring squad for the 1993 New Zealand national rugby league team tour of Great Britain and France, however Angell did not play a test while on tour. He did however wear the Kiwis colours on several tour matches and is Kiwi number 651.

References

External links
Past Kiwi Caps, A New Zealand Rugby League

1970 births
Living people
Canterbury rugby league team players
Featherstone Rovers players
Hornby Panthers players
Junior Kiwis players
New Zealand national rugby league team players
New Zealand rugby league players
Rugby league players from Balclutha, New Zealand
Rugby league props
Rugby league second-rows
Salford Red Devils players
Tasman rugby league team players